For Huasca, see:

Huasca de Ocampo, town in the Mexican state of Hidalgo, seat of the Municipality of Huasca de Ocampo
Ayahuasca, psychoactive concoction prepared from the Amazonian vine Banisteriopsis caapi

See also
Huesca